The Hope Blister were an ambient band that were active from 1997 to 1999.

History 
The band was directed by 4AD Records founder Ivo Watts-Russell, with the music played by singer Louise Rutkowski, bass player Laurence O'Keefe and string arranger Audrey Riley.

The band grew out of the This Mortal Coil project, but with a fixed line-up and focused on cover versions. They released two albums, ...Smile's OK in 1998 and Underarms (featuring vocals by Momus) in 1999, with the band splitting that year following Watts-Russell's retirement from the music industry. An expanded version of Underarms was released in 2005 as Underarms and Sideways, featuring a bonus disc of remixes.

Discography 
...Smile's OK (25 May 1998)
Underarms (15 March 1999)
Underarms and Sideways (12 December 2005)

References

External links
 The Hope Blister on 4AD website

English pop music groups
British ambient music groups
British musical trios
Dream pop musical groups
Ethereal wave musical groups
4AD artists